William Keast (1866 – 22 February 1927) was an Australian politician and member of the Victorian Legislative Assembly for the seats of Dandenong and Berwick and Dandenong between 1900 and 1917.

Profile 
Keast was born in  1866 in Strangways, Victoria. He died on 22 February 1927 in Malvern and was buried in Burwood cemetery. Parents: Stephen Heywood, farmer, and Mary Tynan. Marriage: 3 Apr 1890 with Henrietta Victoria Theodora Brackewagen. Occupation: Produce merchant and stock and station agent. Religion: Catholic. Education: Newstead State School.

Career 
Worked on father's farm; moved to Melbourne 1889; employed by wholesale produce firm, became manager; in business on own account as chaff and grain merchant 1892; expanded to stock and station agent 1899, many large land sales including Chirnside and Winter-Irving estates and Clarke family; owned station at Hay and bred sheep; president Chaff and Grain Association, Clifton Hill Australian Natives Association; campaigned for Federation.

Party 
Party: Ministerialist

Party Note: Minister Independent 1900–1902. Supported no-confidence motion against Bent 1908, Liberal

Appointments 
 Royal commission Grain Handling 1902
 Railway Locomotives 1905
 Tramway Fares 1910-1911
 Marketing and Transportation of Wheat committee 1911
 Royal commission Marketing and Transportation of Grain 1912-1913
 Housing committee 1913
 Royal commission Fruit, Vegetables and Jam 1915
 Public Accounts committee 
1913-1917

References 
Table Talk 14 Oct 1909
Melbourne Punch 26 Sept 1912
Age, Argus 23 Feb 1927
Smith, J. (ed.), 'Cyclopedia of Victoria', 3 vols, Melbourne, 1903–05, 
Browne, G, 'Biographical Register of the Victorian Parliament 1900-84', 1985

1866 births
1902 deaths
Members of the Victorian Legislative Assembly
19th-century Australian politicians